Code page 897 (CCSID 897) is IBM's implementation of the 8-bit form of JIS X 0201. It includes several additional graphical characters in the C0 control characters area, and the code points in question may be used as control characters or graphical characters depending on the context, similarly in concept to OEM-US, but with different graphical characters. The C0 rows are shown below.

Amongst IBM's code pages, it accompanies code page 895, which encodes the ISO 646 set of JIS X 0201, and code page 896 (half-width katakana), which encodes the Kana set (upper half) of JIS X 0201 with extensions. When combined with the double-byte code page 301, it makes up the two code-sets of IBM code page 932 (IBM PC Japan MIX). When combined with the double-byte code page 941, it makes up code page 943 (equivalent to Windows-932, although Microsoft uses ASCII mappings for 0x00 though 0x7F). When combined with the double-byte code page 1393, it makes up code page 1394.

Codepage layout

Code page 1041
Code page 1041 (CCSID 1041) is a superset of code page 897. It is only used with the double-byte code page 301. When the two code pages are combined, this makes up the two code-sets of code page 942 (a superset of code page 932, made up of code page 897 and code page 301).

See also
 Shift JIS

References

897